Pú Huá (Wade–Giles: P'u Hua, traditional: 蒲華, simplified: 蒲华, pinyin: Pú Huá); c. 1834–1911 was a Chinese landscape painter and calligrapher during the Qing Dynasty (1644–1912).

Information
Pu was born in Jiaxing in the Zhejiang province. His style name was 'Zuo Ying'. Pu painted landscapes and ink bamboo in an unconventional style of free and easy brush strokes.

References

1830s births
1911 deaths
Qing dynasty landscape painters

Artists from Jiaxing
Painters from Zhejiang